Former Lives is the debut solo album by Death Cab for Cutie lead singer Ben Gibbard. It was released in October 2012 under Barsuk Records.

Many of the album's tracks feature Gibbard playing all instruments by himself.  Aaron Espinoza is credited as producer for all tracks except 1, 5, 10, 11, and 12.  Other guest musicians include Jon Wurster, Mark Spencer, Aimee Mann, and Zooey Deschanel.

Track list
All songs written by Ben Gibbard, except where noted.

Charts

References

2012 debut albums
Barsuk Records albums
Ben Gibbard albums